Raccordo autostradale 6 (RA 6), managed by ANAS, is a motorway in Central Italy and allows a quick connection of the SS 3 bis (also known as E45) near the city of Perugia with the Autostrada del Sole where the route begins in the locality of Bettolle, municipality of Sinalunga (SI). The RA 6 is a seamless continuation of the Strada statale 715 Siena-Bettolle and, on the other end, it continues (after a short stretch on the SS 3 bis) as SS 75 up to Foligno.

References 

RA06
Transport in Tuscany
Transport in Umbria